"Cartoon Wars Part I" is the third episode in the tenth season of the American animated television series South Park. The 142nd episode of the series overall, it first aired on Comedy Central in the United States on April 5, 2006. It is the first part of a two-episode story-arc, which concludes with "Cartoon Wars Part II". In the episode, it is announced that a Family Guy episode will air with the Islamic prophet Muhammad as a character, leaving the whole of the United States fearing for their lives. Cartman apparently believes that the episode is offensive to Muslims and decides to go to Hollywood to try to get the episode pulled.

The episode was written by series co-creator Trey Parker. Parker and fellow series co-creator Matt Stone originally planned for this episode to be the first of season ten, but disagreements with Comedy Central regarding the depiction of Muhammad forced them to postpone it until later in the season. Once production on the episode began, the dispute still had not been resolved, so it was decided that the story would be split into two separate episodes to allow for more negotiations between the two sides. A similar story-arc was used in the season fourteen episodes "200" and "201".

When the series was transferred to HBO Max in 2020, it was announced that "Cartoon Wars Part I" and "Cartoon Wars Part II" would be 2 of 5 episodes cut from the series, alongside "Super Best Friends", "200," and "201," all of which are episodes featuring Muhammad.

Plot
The townspeople of South Park are in a panic late one night when they discover that a cartoon is going to show an episode featuring Muhammad as a character. Everyone hides in the Community Center for fear of an Islamic terrorist attack and Randy announces that the cartoon is Family Guy. The next morning, everyone is thrilled to find out that there was no attack and that Fox censored the image of Muhammad at the last minute.

It is later announced that the episode was just part one of a two-parter, and that part two will air the following week without censorship. Cartman, who is known among his best friends for having a deep hatred for Family Guy, believes that this is insulting to Muslims, declaring that Fox was right to censor Muhammad. Kyle likes Family Guy and thinks that he is faking until Cartman gives an impassioned speech about keeping people from getting hurt. Kyle is guilt-ridden and believes him, agreeing to go with him after a nightmare where his younger brother Ike is killed by a bomb from the terrorists. Kyle and Cartman set off to Hollywood to get the Family Guy episode pulled.

The people of South Park, meanwhile, decide to literally bury their heads in the sand, so as to show Islamists that they have no part in the insult. On the way to Hollywood, Kyle discovers that Cartman only wants to get Family Guy cancelled as a way to alleviate himself of the comparisons between his brand of humor and that of Family Guy and does not care about the Muslims. Cartman decides to go at it alone, but Kyle insists he will not let that happen. The two start racing one another on their Big Wheels, with Kyle losing to Cartman and being left behind.

U.S. President George W. Bush meets with the Fox executives. The Fox president says that there is something secret about the Family Guy writers that Bush needs to know. At this point, it is revealed this is a two-part episode and that the conclusion will be given in the next episode.

Production
In the DVD commentaries for season ten, series co-creators Trey Parker and Matt Stone spoke about how they experienced difficulties with Comedy Central during the production of Cartoon Wars Part I and Cartoon Wars Part II. They originally wanted to open season ten with these episodes, but were forced to postpone them until later in the season, due to Comedy Central not approving of the depiction of Muhammad. Instead, the season opened with "The Return of Chef", after one of the show's former actors, Isaac Hayes, released a statement bad-mouthing South Park over a previous dispute. Even as Parker and Stone continued to work on Cartoon Wars, the dispute between them and the network had still not been resolved. As a result, the plot was developed into a two-part story-arc to allow for more negotiations between the two sides.

Parker and Stone also clarified their opinions on Family Guy; Parker stated: "we do hate it [...] we understand that people love it [...] we certainly don't think it should be taken off the air [...] we just don't respect it in terms of writing". The two later referred to the writers behind the show as "smart" but emphatically criticized their overuse of "gag-humor". After "Cartoon Wars Part I" aired, Parker and Stone said that they were contacted by the staff of The Simpsons and King of the Hill, who both gave praise for lampooning Family Guy. Parker said that the staff of The Simpsons hate Family Guy more than they do, and that King of the Hills staff said to them, "you're doing God's work". The depictions of Bart Simpson and King of the Hills writing staff in "Cartoon Wars Part II" were influenced by the two shows contacting South Park. Parker and Stone also expressed a level of disappointment with how the episode was received; they felt that people ignored the scope of the Muhammad plot elements and found that more trivial aspects of the show received more attention than they deserved.

The season fourteen episodes "200" and "201" also feature a story-arc involving depictions of Muhammad and censorship in general. Like "Cartoon Wars Part I" and "Cartoon Wars Part II", "200" and particularly "201" caused a large amount of controversy.

Reception
Eric Goldman of IGN gave the episode a 7.0 out of 10, praising the depiction of Family Guy and the cliffhanger ending. In an article a part of a series analyzing television episodes that "exemplify the spirit of [their] time and the properties that make television a unique medium", The A.V. Clubs Noel Murray praised the episode, citing it and "Cartoon Wars Part II" as a good example of Parker and Stone's ability to satirize various forms of media and still be able to write quality episodes despite a large amount of controversy. Seth MacFarlane, creator of Family Guy, called the episode "funny and accurate."

Home media
"Cartoon Wars Part I", along with the fourteen other episodes from South Parks tenth season, was released on a three-disc DVD set in the United States on August 21, 2007. The set includes brief audio commentaries by series co-creators Trey Parker and Matt Stone for each episode. "Cartoon Wars Part I" was also released as part of The Cult of Cartman, a 2008 DVD compilation of Cartman-centric episodes.

See also

 Criticism of Family Guy
 Jyllands-Posten Muhammad cartoons controversy

References

External links

 "Cartoon Wars Part I" Full episode at South Park Studios
 

South Park (season 10) episodes
Jyllands-Posten Muhammad cartoons controversy
Television episodes about Islam
Cultural depictions of Muhammad
Television episodes about censorship
Family Guy
South Park episodes in multiple parts
Television episodes about freedom of expression
Cultural depictions of George W. Bush
Animation controversies in television
Religious controversies in animation
Religious controversies in television
Religious controversies in the United States
Television episodes pulled from general rotation